MIPModDB is a database of comparative protein structure models of MIP (Major intrinsic proteins) family of proteins.

See also
 Major intrinsic proteins

References

External links
 http://bioinfo.iitk.ac.in/MIPModDB.

Biological databases
Protein domains
Protein families
Transmembrane proteins